Colombia's Next Top Model, Cycle 1 was the first cycle of Colombia's Next Top Model.

The cycle featured fifteen contestants, and was hosted by Carolina Guerra. Episodes aired daily, unlike with most version of the Top Model franchise, where episodes air weekly. The prizes for this season included $50,000 in cash, a brand new automobile, a cover of Cromos magazine, and a contract with Chica Águila.

The winner of the competition was 23-year-old Mónica Castaño.

Contestants
(ages stated are at start of contest)

Episodes

Episode 1
First aired January 8, 2013

First call-out: Daniela Raad
Bottom six: Claudia Castro, Juliana Vega, Keidy Johanna Garcés, Natalia Ospina, Naty Sánchez & Tatiana García 
Eliminated: Juliana Vega, Keidy Johanna Garcés, Natalia Ospina, Naty Sánchez & Tatiana García
Featured photographer: Raúl Higuera
Featured director: Juan Camilo Pinzon

Episode 2
First aired January 9, 2013

Immune: Mónica Castaño
First call-out: Anggie Ann Bryan  
Bottom two: Eliana Colorado & Mary Montaño
Eliminated: Eliana Colorado
Featured photographers: Camilo George, Sebastian Quintero

Episode 3
First aired January 10, 2013

Immunity winner: Mónica Castaño
Featured photographer: Hernan Fuentes

Episode 4
First aired January 11, 2013

Immune: Mónica Castaño
First call-out: Julieth Roldan   
Bottom two: Conchita Buendía & Dani Estrada  
Eliminated: Conchita Buendía
Featured photographer: Mauro Gonzalez

Episode 5
First aired January 14, 2013

Immunity winner: Carolina Arango

Episode 6
First aired January 15, 2013

Immune: Carolina Arango 
First call-out: Karin Kipke 
Bottom two: Anggie Ann Bryan & Viviana Salinas
Eliminated: Viviana Salinas

Episode 7
First aired January 16, 2013

Immunity winner: Karin Kipke

Episode 8
First aired January 17, 2013

Immune: Karin Kipke
First call-out: Martha Medina
Bottom two: Anggie Ann Bryan & Dani Estrada
Eliminated: Dani Estrada

Episode 9
First aired January 18, 2013

 Since there was an odd number of girls, Cristy was paired with two girls: Lis and Mary
Immunity winner: Martha Medina

Episode 10
First aired January 21, 2013

Immune: Martha Medina
First call-out: Mónica Castaño  
Bottom two: Carolina Arango & Mary Montaño 
Eliminated: Mary Montaño

Episode 11
First aired January 22, 2013

Immunity winner: Lis Henao

Episode 12
First aired January 23, 2013

Immune: Lis Henao
First call-out: Claudia Castro
Bottom two: Carolina Arango & Daniela Raad 
Eliminated: Daniela Raad

Episode 13
First aired January 24, 2013

Immunity winner: Carolina Arango

Episode 14
First aired January 27, 2013

Immune: Carolina Arango
First call-out: Mónica Castaño  
Bottom two: Julieth Roldán & Karin Kipke
Eliminated: Karin Kipke

Episode 15
First aired January 28, 2013

Eliminated: None

Episode 16
First aired January 29, 2013

Eliminated: None

Episode 17
First aired January 30, 2013

Eliminated: None

Episode 18
First aired January 31, 2013

Eliminated: None

Live finale
First aired February 1, 2013

First call-out: Lis Henao
Bottom Five: Anggie Ann Bryan, Carolina Arango, Cristy Garcés, Julieth Roldán & Martha Medina
Eliminated: Carolina Arango, Cristy Garcés, Julieth Roldán & Martha Medina
Final Four: Anggie Ann Bryan, Claudia Castro, Lis Henao & Mónica Castaño
Colombia's Next Top Model: Mónica Castaño

Summaries

Call-out order

 The contestant was immune from elimination
 The contestant was eliminated
 The contestant won the competition

 In episode 1, the final 15 were selected. The opening credits were shown on the judging panel screen. Each scene represented a girl who had made it through to the main competition.
 In episode 2, Mónica was immune from elimination for having performed the best during the meat-packing shoot. 
 After episode 2, eliminations took place every second episode. The best-performing girl for each photo shoot was declared the episode before each elimination, with that girl winning immunity from elimination.
 In episodes 15-18, the show took a break from eliminations to prolong the voting session that would decide the top four during the live finale. 
 Episode 19 was the live finale. The public vote decided the top four, and from the four remaining contestants, the judges determined the winner.

Photo shoot guide
 Episode 1 photo & video shoot: Basic black dresses; opening credits 
 Episode 2 photo shoots: Meat-packing industry; jewelry beauty shots
 Episode 3 photo shoot: Floating water nymphs in pairs
 Episode 4 photo shoot: Splashing paint
 Episode 5 photo shoot: Posing with snakes in bikinis
 Episode 6 photo shoot: Cheerleaders in the air
 Episode 7 photo shoot: Carnaval de Barranquilla
 Episode 8 photo shoot: Feminine vs masculine alter egos
 Episode 9 photo shoot: Roman Gladiators in pairs
 Episode 10 photo shoot: Comic Book heroes 
 Episode 11 photo shoot: Marble statues with a male model
 Episode 12 photo shoot: Soccer fans in body paint
 Episode 13 photo shoot: Black and white swan Ballerinas suspended in the air
 Episode 14 photo shoot: Wrestlers 
 Episode 15 photo shoots: Modeling on stilts in pairs; portraying famous celebrities
 Episode 16 photo shoots: Posing in bikinis; Lady Speed Stick campaign with a male model; crying beauty shots
 Episode 17 photo shoots: Pin-up girls with cupcakes; modeling in colorful dresses
 Episode 18 photo shoots: Cover tries; lighting oneself in a warehouse

External links
 Official website
  Colombia's Next Top Model Facebook page

References

2013 Colombian television seasons
Colombia's Next Top Model